The Piquiri River is a river of Paraná state in southern Brazil. It is a tributary of the Paraná River. Its name is officially spelled Piquiri, with variants including Peguirí, Pequir, Pequirí, Pequiry, and Piquiry.

See also
 List of rivers of Paraná
 Tributaries of the Río de la Plata

References

Rivers of Paraná (state)
Tributaries of the Paraná River